Dominik Glavina (born 6 December 1992) is a Croatian footballer who plays as a forward for Bjelovar.

Club career
Glavina came up through the NK Varteks youth system, and played for their U-19 squad. The Varteks lost their main sponsor, Varteks clothing factory,  in 2010, so changed its 52-year-old name to NK Varaždin; this was the name when Glavina made his senior debut with the club in 2010. He started in both games of the 2011–12 UEFA Europa League qualifiers. During the first leg against Lusitanos, he scored Varaždin's third goal. After playing with six other clubs over the years, Glavina returned to the city of Varaždin to once again play with a club based at its Stadion Varteks, when he signed with NK Varaždin in 2019albeit a club not associated with the club from the start of his career, as the original "Varteks / Varaždin" never recovered from losing its sponsor, stopped paying its players, then went bankrupt and folded in 2015.

Honours
Universitatea Craiova
Cupa României: 2017–18
Supercupa României: Runner-up 2018

References

External links
 

1992 births
Living people
Sportspeople from Čakovec
Association football forwards
Croatian footballers
Croatia youth international footballers
Croatia under-21 international footballers
NK Varaždin players
Beitar Jerusalem F.C. players
NK Slaven Belupo players
NK Inter Zaprešić players
NK Rudar Velenje players
CS Universitatea Craiova players
Enosis Neon Paralimni FC players
NK Varaždin (2012) players
NK Međimurje players
NK Bjelovar players
Croatian Football League players
Israeli Premier League players
First Football League (Croatia) players
Slovenian PrvaLiga players
Liga I players
Cypriot First Division players
Second Football League (Croatia) players
Croatian expatriate footballers
Expatriate footballers in Israel
Croatian expatriate sportspeople in Israel
Expatriate footballers in Slovenia
Croatian expatriate sportspeople in Slovenia
Expatriate footballers in Romania
Croatian expatriate sportspeople in Romania
Expatriate footballers in Cyprus
Croatian expatriate sportspeople in Cyprus